Karishma Kudrat Kaa is a 1985 Hindi-language Indian film directed by Sunil Hingorani and starring Dharmendra,  Anita Raj in lead roles  and Mithun Chakraborty, Rati Agnihotri, Shakti Kapoor, Saeed Jaffrey in supporting roles.

Plot 
Vijay is a simple-minded widower who lives in a small rural town in India with his unmarried sister, Radha his son and his widowed mother. Radha is soon to be married to Sub Inspector Raj. One day Vijay witnesses a killing of a young child by notorious bandit Bhagad Singh, and chides him. As a result, Bhagad and his gang severely beat him up, and only spare his life after Vijay's mom begs them to forgive him. But Lala Dayaluram hires Bhagad to ensure that Vijay and his family leave the town, and when they refuse Vijay is abducted, severely beaten and left for dead and the other side escaped convict and killer named Karan, who was Vijay's lookalike, finds Vijay in unconscious condition, and decides to assume his identity, stabs him, and throws him to his death from atop a cliff. Karan then goes to live with his family. The motive for Karan to live here is merely to hide under Vijay's name until the police give up their manhunt for him. No one really notices the change in Vijay. Karan starts to frequent the nearby brothel run by Kammobai, and soon realizes that he can make much money by selling young women to her. His first target that he intends to lure to Kammobai is none other than Radha, Vijay's sister. This is just one of the destructive methods he intends to employ in his new identity and there is no one who can dare to suspect nor stop him.

Paro a village girl and step sister of Raj who was actually made to marry with Vijay. When Karan meets her he falls in love with her and also discloses his true identity that he is not Vijay, only Paro knows that he is not Vijay. Another side police department also shocked by sudden disappearance of Karan.

One day Bhagad Singh comes with his gang and try to beat Karan thinking him as Vijay. Karan was unaware about Bhagad Singh. Raj and Karan both gets gathered and makes them to run away from there Karan shoots on Bhagad Singh's one eye and he becomes blind.

After a days Raj observes Vijay's face and doubts that he is Karan. In temple Karan was trying to marry with Paro. Suddenly Raj comes with department and arrest him and tells Paro that he is not Vijay his Karan who looks like him, in front of the police Karan pretends to know nothing about himself. Karan puts duplicate fingerprint on his hand and escapes from fhe police. As soon as coming from jail he marries Paro and makes his sister and his mother happy. Radha and Raj marry and on the same day Raj resigns his job to catch Karan and revenge.

But Karan feels bad that he has resigned his job and he accepts the truth that he is Karan not Vijay and tells their family that Vijay is no more and he is dead. Vijay's mother feels bad galls on Karan. Police arrests Karan and he was in jail. But actually Vijay was alive, when Karan thrown him from hills Vijay was got to group of Sadhus and he was treated homeopathic treatment and he was saved. Vijay regains consciousness and recovers, making his son happy.

Unfortunately Bhagad Singh and his gang arrives and kidnaps Vijay and his son. Paro goes to jail and she tells him everything. Karan tries to escape from jail but the police shoot him in the stomach but he escapes and comes to spot of Bhagad Singh in injury condition to save Vijay and his son. In fight Bhagad Singh tries to knock Karan but he was able to beat and kill Bhagad Singh and his gang in bloody fight. He removes Vijay son from the cage in which Bhagad Singh had confined him, sends him near to Vijay and dies in front of everyone, all feels sad and gets emotional. Everyone attends Karan's funeral and cremation.

Cast

Dharmendra as Vijay/Karan (double role)
Mithun Chakraborty as Sub-Inspector Raj/Radha's husband
Rati Agnihotri as Radha/Vijay's sister
Anita Raj as Paro 
Urmila Bhatt as Vijay's mother
Saeed Jaffrey as Lala Dayaluram
Shakti Kapoor as  Daciat Sardar Bhagad Singh 
Urmila Bhatt as the mother of Vijay/Karan
Padma Khanna as the mother of the dead child 
Jankidas as Seth Jankidas, a jeweller
Dinesh Hingoo as Kammobai's patron 
Praveen Kumar as Zoravar 
Lalita Kumari as Kammobai 
Mehmood Jr. as Dayaluram's assistant 
Raj Mehra as Mahadev 
Ram Mohan as Robert 
Murad as Guru 
Jagdish Raj as Inspector General of Police 
Prem Sagar as Police Commissioner 
Padma Khanna as Widow, and mother of the slain child
Manik Irani as Rangaraj
Deep Dhillon as Dacait Shera, henchman of Bhagad Singh

Soundtrack

References

External links
 
http://ibosnetwork.com/asp/filmbodetails.asp?id=Karishma+Kudrat+Ka

1985 films
1980s Hindi-language films
Indian action films
Films scored by Kalyanji Anandji
1985 action films